The subfamily Catantopinae is a group of insects classified under family Acrididae. Genera such as Macrotona may sometimes called "spur-throated grasshoppers", but that name is also used for grasshoppers from other subfamilies, including the genus Melanoplus from the Melanoplinae. Indeed, the delimitation of these two subfamilies needs restudy: the Podismini for example are sometimes placed here, sometimes in the Melanoplinae.

Tribes and Selected Genera

Tribes A-D

 Allagini - Eastern Africa, including Madagascar
 Allaga (insect) Karsch, 1896
 Sauracris Burr, 1900
 Apoboleini - Africa, Indo-China
 Apoboleus Karsch, 1891
 Pseudophialosphera Dirsh, 1952
 Squamobibracte Ingrisch, 1989

 Catantopini - Africa, Asia, Australiamany: see tribe page - including:
Catantops Schaum, 1853
Diabolocatantops Jago, 1984
Macrotona Brunner von Wattenwyl, 1893
Stenocatantops Dirsh, 1953
Xenocatantops Dirsh, 1953
 Diexiini - Western Asia
 Bufonacridella Adelung, 1910
 Diexis Zubovski, 1899

Gereniini

Distribution: India, Indo-China
 Anacranae Miller, 1934
 Anasedulia - monotypic - A. maejophrae Dawwrueng, Storozhenko & Asanok, 2015 (Thailand)
 Bibractella Storozhenko, 2002 - monotypic
 Gerenia Stål, 1878
 Leosedulia - monotypic - L. mistshenkoi Storozhenko, 2009

Mesambriini

Auth. Brunner von Wattenwyl, 1893; distribution: Madagascar, India, East Asia
 Celebesia Bolívar, 1917
 Mesambria (insect) Stål, 1878
 Pyrgophistes - monotypic - Pyrgophistes chinnicki Key, 1992
 Ranacris You & Lin, 1983
 Traulia Stål, 1873

Other Tribes H-P
 Histrioacridini - Australia
 Histrioacrida Sjöstedt, 1930
 Scurra Key, 1992
 Kakaduacridini - Australia
 Kakaduacris Key, 1992
 Merehanini - Eastern Africa
 Merehana Kevan, 1957
 Oxyrrhepini - Sri Lanka, China, Indo-China, Malesia
 Oxyrrhepes Stål, 1873
 Paraconophymatini - Western Asia to India
 Paraconophyma Uvarov, 1921

Tauchirini
Distribution: South-East Asia
 Chapacris Tinkham, 1940
 Tauchira Stål, 1878
 Toacris Tinkham, 1940

Tribes U-Z
 Urnisiellini - Australia
 Urnisiella Sjöstedt, 1930
 Uvaroviini - Western Asia
 Uvarovium Dirsh, 1927
 Wiltshirellini Shumakov, 1963 - Middle East
 Wiltshirella - monotypic W. fusiformis Popov, 1951
 Xenacanthippini - China, Peninsular Malaysia
 Xenacanthippus Miller, 1934

genus group Serpusiae 
Auth.: Johnston, 1956; distribution: tropical Africa including Madagascar
 Aresceutica Karsch, 1896
 Auloserpusia Rehn, 1914
 Coenona Karsch, 1896
 Pteropera Karsch, 1891
 Segellia Karsch, 1891
 Serpusia Karsch, 1891
 Serpusilla Ramme, 1931

incertae sedis
Many other genera are not yet assigned to tribes.

 Abisares Stål, 1878
 Allotriusia Karsch, 1896
 Alpinacris Bigelow, 1967
 Alulacris Zheng, 1981
 Alulacroides Zheng, Dong & Xu, 2010
 Ambrea Dirsh, 1962
 Amismizia Bolívar, 1914
 Anapropacris Uvarov, 1953
 Angolacris Dirsh, 1962
 Anischnansis Dirsh, 1959
 Anomalocatantops Jago, 1984
 Anthermus Stål, 1878
 Antita Bolívar, 1908
 Apalniacris Ingrisch, Willemse & Shishodia, 2004
 Arminda Krauss, 1892
 Assamacris Uvarov, 1942
 Bacuita Strand, 1932
 Bambusacris Henry, 1933
 Bannacris Zheng, 1980
 Barombia Karsch, 1891
 Beybienkoacris Storozhenko, 2005
 Bhutanacridella Willemse, 1962
 Bibracte Stål, 1878
 Binaluacris Willemse, 1932
 Brachaspis Hutton, 1898
 Brachycatantops Dirsh, 1953
 Brachyelytracris Baehr, 1992
 Brownacris Dirsh, 1958
 Bumacris Willemse, 1931
 Burmacris Uvarov, 1942
 Burttia Dirsh, 1951
 Calderonia Bolívar, 1908
 Callicatantops Uvarov, 1953
 Cardeniopsis Dirsh, 1955
 Cardenius Bolívar, 1911
 Carsula Stål, 1878
 Caryandoides Zheng & Xie, 2007- synonym Yinia Liu & Li, 1995
 Carydana Bolívar, 1918 - monotypic Carydana agomena (Karsch, 1896)
 Cerechta Bolívar, 1922
 Choroedocus Bolívar, 1914
 Chromophialosphera Descamps & Donskoff, 1968
 Cingalia Ramme, 1941
 Circocephalus Willemse, 1928
 Coloracris Willemse, 1938
 Coniocara Henry, 1940
 Criotocatantops Jago, 1984
 Crobylostenus Ramme, 1929
 Cryptocatantops Jago, 1984
 Cylindracris Descamps & Wintrebert, 1967
 Deliacris Ramme, 1941
 Dendrocatantops Descamps & Wintrebert, 1966
 Descampsilla Wintrebert, 1972
 Digrammacris Jago, 1984
 Dioscoridus Popov, 1957
 Dirshilla Wintrebert, 1972
 Dubitacris Henry, 1937
 Duplessisia Dirsh, 1956
 Duviardia Donskoff, 1985
 Eliya Uvarov, 1927
 Enoplotettix Bolívar, 1913
 Epacrocatantops Jago, 1984
 Eritrichius Bolívar, 1898
 Eubocoana Sjöstedt, 1931
 Eupreponotus Uvarov, 1921
 Eupropacris Walker, 1870
 Exopropacris Dirsh, 1951
 Fer Bolívar, 1918
 Frontifissia Key, 1937
 Gemeneta Karsch, 1892
 Genimenoides Henry, 1934
 Gerunda (insect) Bolívar, 1918
 Guineacris Ramme, 1941
 Hadrolecocatantops Jago, 1984
 Harantacris Wintrebert, 1972
 Harpezocatantops Jago, 1984
 Hebridea Willemse, 1926
 Heinrichius Ramme, 1941
 Ikonnikovia Bey-Bienko, 1935
 Indomesambria Ingrisch, 2006
 Ischnansis Karsch, 1896
 Ixalidium Gerstaecker, 1869
 Javanacris Willemse, 1955
 Kinangopa Uvarov, 1938
 Kwidschwia Rehn, 1914
 Lefroya Kirby, 1914
 Longchuanacris Zheng & Fu, 1989
 Maculacris Willemse, 1932
 Madimbania Dirsh, 1953
 Maga (insect) Bolívar, 1918
 Magaella Willemse, 1974
 Malua (insect) Ramme, 1941
 Mananara (insect) Dirsh, 1962
 Mayottea Rehn, 1959
 Mazaea (insect) Stål, 1876
 Melicodes Uvarov, 1923
 Melinocatantops Jago, 1984
 Meltripata Bolívar, 1923
 Micronacris Willemse, 1957
 Milleriana - monotypic Milleriana brunnea Willemse, 1957
 Moessonia Willemse, 1922
 Molucola Bolívar, 1915
 Mopla Henry, 1940
 Naraikadua Henry, 1940
 Nathanacris Willemse & Ingrisch, 2004
 Navasia Kirby, 1914 - monotypic
 Noliba Bolívar, 1922
 Oenocatantops Dirsh, 1953
 Opharicus Uvarov, 1940
 Orthocephalum Willemse, 1921
 Oshwea Ramme, 1929
 Oxycardenius Uvarov, 1953
 Oxycatantops Dirsh, 1953
 Pachycatantops Dirsh, 1953
 Pagdenia Miller, 1934
 Palniacris Henry, 1940
 Paprides Hutton, 1898
 Paracardenius Bolívar, 1912
 Paracaryanda Willemse, 1955
 Parahysiella Wintrebert, 1972
 Paramesambria Willemse, 1957
 Paraperineta Descamps & Wintrebert, 1967
 Parapropacris Ramme, 1929
 Paraserpusilla Dirsh, 1962
 Parastenocrobylus Willemse, 1921
 Paratoacris Li & Jin, 1984
 Paraxenotettix Dirsh, 1961
 Pareuthymia Willemse, 1930
 Peitharchicus Brunner von Wattenwyl, 1898
 Pelecinotus Bolívar, 1902
 Perakia Ramme, 1929
 Perineta Dirsh, 1962
 Pezocatantops Dirsh, 1953
 Platycatantops Baccetti, 1985
 Platycercacris Zheng & Shi, 2001
 Pododula Karsch, 1896
 Pseudofinotina Dirsh, 1962
 Pseudogerunda Bey-Bienko, 1935
 Pseudohysiella Dirsh, 1962
 Pteroperina Ramme, 1929
 Pyramisternum Huang, 1983
 Racilia Stål, 1878
 Racilidea Bolívar, 1918
 Rugulacris Zheng & Wei, 2007
 Salinacris Willemse, 1957
 Sedulia Stål, 1878
 Serpusiacris Descamps & Wintrebert, 1967
 Serpusiformia Dirsh, 1966
 Seyrigacris Bolívar, 1932
 Shennongipodisma Zhong & Zheng, 2004
 Siamacris Willemse, 1955
 Siebersia Willemse, 1933
 Sinopodismoides Gong, Zheng & Lian, 1995
 Sphaerocranae Willemse, 1972
 Staurocleis Uvarov, 1923
 Striatosedulia Ingrisch, 1989
 Strombocardeniopsis Jago, 1984
 Sygrus Bolívar, 1889
 Tangana Ramme, 1929
 Tarbaleus Brunner von Wattenwyl, 1898
 Tauchiridea Bolívar, 1918
 Thymiacris Willemse, 1937
 Tinnevellia Henry, 1940
 Tonkinacrisoides monotypic T. guangxiensis Zheng & Wei, 2007
 Traulacris Willemse, 1933
 Triodicolacris Baehr, 1992
 Tuberofera Willemse, 1930
 Tunstallops Jago, 1984
 Utanacris Miller, 1934
 Uvarovacris Rehn, 1944
 Veseyacris Dirsh, 1959
 Visayia Rehn, 1944
 Vitticatantops Sjöstedt, 1931
 Vohemara Dirsh, 1966
 Xenotettix Uvarov, 1925
 Zeylanacris Rehn, 1944

References

External links 
 
 

 
Acrididae
Orthoptera subfamilies
Taxa named by Carl Brunner von Wattenwyl